Servatius may refer to:

 Servatius of Tongeren (died 384)
 Servatius Ludwig (1907–1946), German missionary to China
 Brigitte Servatius (born 1954), Austrian-American mathematician
 Darren Servatius (1966–2019), Canadian hockey player
 Robert Servatius (1894–1983), German lawyer, defender at the trial of Adolf Eichmann
 Victor Servatius, pseudonym of Dutch sexologist Frits Bernard

See also
 Servetus

Surnames from given names